Ayelet Fishbach is the Jeffrey Breakenridge Keller Professor of Behavioral Science and Marketing and IBM Corporation Faculty Scholar at the University of Chicago Booth School of Business She is past president the Society for the Science of Motivation, and the International Social Cognition Network.

Life 
She graduated from  Tel Aviv University. She is associate editor of Journal of Personality and Social Psychology and Psychological Science.

Fishbach studies social psychology, management and consumer behavior.

Publications

References

External links 

 Ayelet Fishbach, personal website
 Ayelet Fishbach on Goals and Motivation on the Social Science Bites podcast

University of Chicago Booth School of Business faculty
Tel Aviv University alumni
Social psychologists